Un Amor de Película (Love Just Like in the Movies) is a Spanish-language telenovela to be produced by United States-based television network Telemundo Studios, Miami.

Telemundo will air the serial from Monday to Friday during the 2011-2012 season. As with most of its other telenovelas, the network  broadcasts English subtitles as closed captions on CC3.

References

Spanish-language telenovelas
Television pilots not picked up as a series